The following table provides details of the major traffic flows (by airport) in Pakistan in terms of passenger numbers, aircraft movements, cargo as well as mail during the year July 2018 - June 2019. The results were collected by the Civil Aviation Authority of Pakistan.

Statistics

References

Pakistan
Airports
Airports
Airports